Klata is a Polish surname. Notable people with the surname include:

 Henryk Klata (born 1942), Polish economist and politician
 Katarzyna Klata (born 1972), Polish archer
 Wojciech Klata (born 1976), Polish actor

See also
 

Polish-language surnames